Eugnophomyia luctuosa is a species in the family Limoniidae ("limoniid crane flies"), in the order Diptera ("flies").

References

Further reading

External links
Diptera.info

Limoniidae
Insects described in 1860